Terry is an unincorporated community in Raleigh County, West Virginia, United States.

The community was named for the son of a mining official.

References

Unincorporated communities in Raleigh County, West Virginia
Unincorporated communities in West Virginia
Coal towns in West Virginia